Preetz is a town in the district of Plön, in Schleswig-Holstein, Northern Germany.

Preetz may also refer to:

Preetz, Mecklenburg-Vorpommern, municipality in Mecklenburg-Vorpommern, Germany.
Michael Preetz (born 1967), retired German footballer

See also